Minuscule 498 (in the Gregory-Aland numbering), δ 402 (in the Soden numbering), is a Greek minuscule manuscript of the New Testament, on parchment. Palaeographically it has been assigned to the 14th-century. 
Scrivener labelled it by number 584.
The manuscript is lacunose.

Description 

The codex contains the text of the whole New Testament on 186 parchment leaves (size ) with some lacunae (Matthew 1:1-2:12; Mark 5:2-6:10; Acts 1:1-5:2; James 1:1-5:4; Jude; Romans 1:1-4:9; 2 Thess 2:14-3:18; 1 Timothy 1:1-13; 6:19-21; 2 Timothy 1:1-2:19).

The text is written in one column per page, 35 lines per page, in very small hand. The text of the Gospels is divided according to Ammonian Sections, whose numbers are given at the margin, with references to the Eusebian Canons. It contains prolegomena (later hand), Eusebian Canon tables, and Euthalian Apparatus.
In Acts  (titles) and lectionary markings at the margin, prolegomena to every epistle.

The order of books: Gospels, Acts, Catholic epistles, Pauline epistles, and Apocalypse. The order of Gospels: Matthew, Luke, Mark, John (as in codex 392).

Text 

The Greek text of the codex is a representative of the Byzantine text-type. Aland placed it in Category V.
According to the Claremont Profile Method it represents the textual group M1386 in Luke 1, Luke 10, and Luke 20 (weak).

History 

It is dated by the INTF to the 14th-century.

The manuscript was written by Gerasimus. It was bought in 1848 by Thomas Rodd. 
The manuscript was added to the list of New Testament manuscripts by Scrivener. It was examined by Bloomfield. Scrivener thoroughly examined and collated its text. Herman C. Hoskier collated text of the Apocalypse.

It is currently housed at the British Library (Add MS 17469) in London.

See also 

 List of New Testament minuscules
 Biblical manuscript
 Textual criticism

References

Further reading 

  (as j)
 Herman C. Hoskier, Concerning the Text of the Apocalypse (1 vol., London, 1929), p. 296.

Greek New Testament minuscules
14th-century biblical manuscripts
British Library additional manuscripts